Georgy Kiesewalter (Russian: Георгий Кизевальтер, b. 1955 in Moscow) is a Russian conceptual artist, photographer and essayist. As an artist, he uses a wide range of media to communicate his concepts to the public – from painting to graphic art, from installations to conceptual photography and digital art.

Biography

Georgy's ancestors were German – hence the surname, but due to his Russian origin, it has been often erroneously anglicized just as Kizevalter or Kisevalter. He graduated from Moscow Lenin Pedagogical Institute in 1977. In 1976–89, he was one of the original members of the Russian conceptual performance group Collective Actions. In the mid 1970s – 1980s, he was very close to the circle of artists like Ilya Kabakov, Viktor Pivovarov, Erik Bulatov, Ivan Chuikov et al., and actively participated in such unofficial artistic formations of the time as the AptArt movement, the Moscow Archive of New Art (MANI), and the Avantgardists' Club in Moscow. In 1996, he decided to move to Canada, but returned to Russia at the end of 2006.

In the early 1990s, Kiesewalter arranged a number of broadcasts on arts and culture issues on Radio Liberty in Munich, Germany. He is also the author or co-author of several books and many articles on contemporary art and photography published in Russia. In 1997, he received an Open Society Institute grant to help publish his first book about Moscow's unofficial artists, The Communal Body of Moscow.

His works can be found in many private and institutional collections, including the Tretyakov Gallery (Moscow), the Jane Voorhees Zimmerli Art Museum at Rutgers, the State University of New Jersey, and the Duke University Museum of Art (USA), Kunstmuseum in Bern, Switzerland, Centre Georges Pompidou, Paris; the National Centre for Contemporary Arts, the Moscow Museum of Modern Art, Garage Museum of Contemporary Art and Ekaterina Cultural Foundation (all in Moscow), the Kolodzei Art Foundation (New Jersey – Moscow), and many others.

Major exhibitions

1976 – Unofficial apartment shows, Moscow
1977 – La nuova arte Sovietica: Una prospettiva non ufficiale. La Biennale di Venezia, Venice, Italy
1981 – Russian New Wave. Contemporary Russian Art Center of America, New York, USA 
1983 – Vassya Museum. AptArt Gallery, Moscow (solo exhibition)
1984 – AptArt in Tribeca. Contemporary Russian Art Center of America, New York, USA
1985 – AptArt. Moscow Vanguard in the ‘80s. Washington Project for the Arts, Washington
1988 – Art Chicago
1988 – Art Basel
1988 – I Live – I See: Moscow Artists of the 1980s. Kunstmuseum Bern, Switzerland
1989 – The Green Show. Exit Art, New York, USA; Dunlop Art Gallery, Regina; Mendel Art Gallery, Saskatoon, Canada
1990 – Sommer Atelier (Junge Kunst in Europa). Hannover, Germany
1990 – G. Kizevalter: And Where is the National School?  F. Duran Gallery, Madrid, Spain (solo exhibition)
1990 – Towards the Object. Stedelijk Museum Amsterdam
1991–1993 Prospects of Conceptualism. The University of Hawaii Art Gallery, Honolulu; The Clocktower Gallery P.S.1, New York;  North Carolina Museum of Art, Raleigh, USA
1991 – Contemporary Soviet Art. Setagaia Art Museum, Tokyo, Japan
1991 – Contemporary Soviet Artists. Auditorio de Galicia, Santiago de Compostela, Spain
1991 – MANI Museum: 40 Moskauer Künstler. Frankfurter Karmeliterkloster, Frankfurt am Main, Germany
1991 – Kabakov, Kizevalter, Makarevich. Parallel 39 Gallery, Valencia, Spain
1993 – Monuments: Transformation for the Future. World Financial Center, New York, USA; Central House of Artist, Moscow; Kunstihoone, Tallinn
1995 – Kunst im Verborgenen. Nonkonformisten Ruβland 1957–1995. Wilhelm-Hack-Museum, Ludwigshafen am Rhein; documenta-Halle, Kassel; Staatliches Lindenau-Museum, Altenburg, Germany; Manege Central Exhibition Hall, Moscow
1995–1996 Flug, Entfernung, Verschwinden. Konzeptuelle Moskauer Kunst. Galerie Hlavniho Mesta Prahy, Prague; Haus am Waldsee, Berlin; Stadtgalerie im Sophienhof, Kiel, Germany
1996 – Fluxus: Yesterday, Today, and Tomorrow. History without Border. Central House of Artists, Moscow 
1996 – Russian Conceptual Art of the 1980s: the Collection of the Duke University Museum of Art. Nasher Museum of Art at Duke University (USA)
1998 – Russian Landscape. Geneva, Switzerland
2005 – Collaborators. State Tretyakov Gallery, Moscow (within the framework of the First Moscow Biennale)
2006 – Artists Against the State: Perestroika Revisited. Ronald Feldman Gallery, New York 
2007 – Sots Art. State Tretyakov Gallery, Moscow; La Maison Rouge, Paris
2007, 2008, 2009 – Sotheby's Art Auction exhibitions
2008 – Total  Enlightenment. Conceptual Art in Moscow 1960–1990. Schirn Kunsthalle, Frankfurt am Main, Germany; Fundación Juan March, Madrid
2008 – Performing the Archive: Collective Actions in the 1970s-80s. Zimmerli Art Museum at Rutgers, the State University of New Jersey, USA
2009 – Not Toys?! State Tretyakov Gallery, Moscow (within the framework of the Third Moscow Biennale)
2010 – Field of Action. Moscow Conceptual School and its context. Ekaterina Art Foundation, Moscow
2011 – New Hagiography Project. Moscow Museum of Modern Art, Moscow (solo exhibition)
2013 – Expansion of the Object. Moscow Museum of Modern Art
2013 – Dreams For Those Who Are Awake. Moscow Museum of Modern Art
2013 – Department of Labour and Employment. State Tretyakov Gallery, Moscow
2014-15 – Rauschenberg: Collecting & Connecting. Nasher Museum of Art at Duke University, Durham, NC, USA.
2015 – Insider. Garage Museum of Contemporary Art, Moscow (solo exhibition).
2016 – “Thinking Pictures”: Moscow Conceptual Art in the Dodge Collection. Voorhees Gallery, Zimmerli Art Museum at Rutgers University. NJ, USA.
2016 – Kollektsia ! Contemporary Art in the USSR and Russia. 1950-2000. Centre Georges Pompidou, Paris.
2020 – Regaining a Paradise Lost: the Role of the Arts. APS Mdina Cathedral Contemporary Art Biennale, Mdina, Malta.
2021 – Waves and Echoes: Postmodernism and the Global 1980s. Beijing Inside-Out Art Museum, China.
2021-22 – Other Spaces. In Artists’ Studios. The Ekaterina Cultural Foundation, Moscow (solo exhibition).
2022 — Thinking Pictures. Kumu Art Museum, Tallinn, Estonia.

Books and essays

The Collective Actions group. Trips to the Countryside (Rus. Поездки за город). Moscow: Ad Marginem, 1998 (co-author). 
G. Kiesewalter. The Communal Body of Moscow (Rus. Коммунальное тело Москвы). Moscow: Restart/Polidiz, 1999
In Anatoly Zverev in the Memoirs of his Contemporaries. (Rus. Анатолий Зверев в воспоминаниях современников) Moscow: Molodaya Gvardiya, 2006. 
Those Strange Seventies or Loss of Innocence (Rus. Эти странные семидесятые, или Потеря невинности). Edited, compiled, and designed by G. Kiesewalter. Moscow: New Literary Observer, 2010. 
The Watershed Eighties in Unofficial Soviet Art (Rus. Переломные восьмидесятые в неофициальном искусстве СССР). Edited, compiled, and designed by G. Kiesewalter. Moscow: New Literary Observer, 2014. 
Samizdat as a means of survival for unofficial Soviet artists. In Actasamizdatica / Записки о самиздате. Anthology : Issue 2. Compiled by E.Strukova, B.Belenkin, with contributions from G.Superfin; SHPL of Russia; International Memorial. Moscow, 2015. , 
Georgy Kiesewalter. Time of Hopes, Time of Illusions. On the Problems of the History of Soviet Unofficial Art. 1950-1960: Articles and Materials. (Rus. Время надежд, время иллюзий. Проблемы истории советского неофициального искусства. 1950–1960 годы: Статьи и материалы). Moscow: New Literary Observer, 2018. 
A selection of texts (in English) and photos by Kiesewalter dedicated to the 80th anniversary of the influential Estonian artist and theoretician Tõnis Vint (1942-2019) in the Estonian magazine Kunst #1, 2022
Georgy Kiesewalter. Reports from under-the-walls. An alternative history of unofficial culture in the USSR in the 1970s and 1980s through the eyes of foreign journalists, supplemented by interviews with its heroes. (Rus. Репортажи из-под-валов. Альтернативная история неофициальной культуры в 1970-х и 1980-х годах в СССР глазами иностранных журналистов, дополненная интервью с ее героями). Moscow: New Literary Observer, 2022.

References
Georgy Kiesewalter. In Artists' Studios. Moscow: Ekaterina Cultural Foundation, 2021. .
Margarita Tupitsyn, Victor Tupitsyn a. o. Anti-Shows. AptArt 1982-84. Afterall Books, London. 2017. .
George Kiesewalter. Insider. Album. Garage Museum of Contemporary Art, Moscow, 2016. . 
Ilona Kiss. Orpheusz Jakutföldön. Balkon #9, 2014, pp. 28–33 (Hungary).
Kristine Stiles. Rauschenberg, Looking Long and Thinking Hard. 
Octavian Eşanu. Transition in Post-Soviet Art. CEU Press, 2013. .
Sidney E. Dement. Umbrellas, Dialectic, and Dialogue in Borislav Pekić's How to Quiet a Vampire. Slavic and East European Journal, Vol. 56, No. 2 (2012).
Collective Actions. Audience recollections from the first five years, 1976-1981. Soberscove Press, Chicago, 2012. .
Alla Rosenfeld (Gen. Ed.). Moscow Conceptualism in Context. ZAM. Prestel Publishing Ltd. 2011. . 
Total enlightenment. Moscow Conceptual Art 1960-1990. Schirn Kunsthalle Frankfurt - Fundacion Juan March, Madrid. 2008. .
Beyond Memory: Soviet Nonconformist Photography and Photo-related Works of Art. Edited by Diane Neumaier, Jane Voorhees Zimmerli Art Museum, 2004. 
Andrew Solomon. The Irony Tower. Soviet artists in a time of Glasnost. New York, Alfred A. Knopf, 1991. .
Victor Tupitsyn. The Sun without a Muzzle. Art Journal, Summer 1994. 
Artistas Rusos Contemporaneos (exhibition catalogue). Auditorio de Galicia, Santiago de Compostela. 1991.
Matthew Cullerne Bown. Contemporary Russian Art. Oxford, Phaidon Press Ltd, 1989. .
Matthew Cullerne Bown. A Dictionary of Twentieth Century Russian and Soviet Painters, 1900-80s. Izo, 1998. .
Margarita Tupitsyn. Margins of Soviet art: socialist realism to the present. Giancarlo Politi Editore, 1989. .
Flash Art ##76-77, July–August 1977.

External links
Official George Kiesewalter website

1955 births
Living people
Russian artists